Airway Heights is a city in Spokane County, Washington, United States, just west of Spokane. The population was 10,757 at the 2020 census. The city's name was taken from its close proximity to the runways at Fairchild Air Force Base and Spokane International Airport.

History
Airway Heights was founded in 1942 and officially incorporated on June 28, 1955.

Growth in the city was spurred by the opening of the Airway Heights Corrections Center by the Washington State Department of Corrections in 1992 and the opening of the Northern Quest Resort & Casino by the Kalispel Indian Tribe in 2000. More recently, with the addition of a new Wal-Mart Supercenter, several new apartment buildings and housing developments, the expansion of the Northern Quest Casino, and the opening of the Spokane Tribe Casino, Airway Heights is continuing to grow. Also, the Spokane County Raceway Park is located in Airway Heights, and features major automobile events, including drag racing, stock car racing, and occasional monster truck shows.

Geography
Airway Heights is located at  (47.643648, -117.586491). Downtown Spokane is located eight miles by road east of Airway Heights. In 2012, the City of Spokane incorporated the Spokane International Airport and surrounding area, since which the city Spokane has bordered the city of Airway Heights to the east and south.

The community lies in the northeastern corner of the flat Columbia Plateau. While the plateau tends to be flat, the terrain locally is quite rugged as it is part of the Channeled Scablands. The "heights" in the city's name references its location at a higher elevation than the city center of Spokane. Traveling into Airway Heights along U.S. 2, the main road into the city, from Downtown Spokane, one will climb over 500 feet.

Highway 2 is the main east-west thoroughfare in the city. It connects Airway Heights with Fairchild to the west and Spokane to the east. Interstate 90 runs just a few miles south of the city.

Climate

Demographics

2020 census
At the 2020 census there were 10,757 people in 2,371 households in the city.

2010 census
At the 2010 census there were 6,114 people in 1,547 households, including 1,035 families, in the city. The racial makeup of the city was 78.5% White, 7.2% African American, 3.7% Native American, 3.5% Asian, 0.9% Pacific Islander, 1.8% from other races, and 4.4% from two or more races. Hispanic or Latino people of any race were 8.3%.

Of the 1,547 households, 37.4% had children under the age of 18 living with them, 43.6% were married couples living together, 16.6% had a female householder with no husband present, 6.7% had a male householder with no wife present, and 33.1% were non-families. 25.1% of households were one person and 5.4% were one person aged 65 or older. The average household size was 2.54 and the average family size was 3.01.

The median age was 34.6 years. 17.3% of residents were under the age of 18; 11.1% were between the ages of 18 and 24; 40.9% were from 25 to 44; 25.2% were from 45 to 64; and 5.6% were 65 or older. The gender makeup of the city was 67.7% male and 32.3% female.

2000 census
At the 2000 census, there were 4,500 people in 958 households, including 656 families, in the city. The population density was 923.0 people per square mile (356.0/km). There were 1,095 housing units at an average density of 224.6 per square mile (86.6/km). The racial makeup of the city was 69.51% White, 10.47% African American, 3.20% Native American, 1.84% Asian, 0.38% Pacific Islander, 1.56% from other races, and 3.11% from two or more races. Hispanic or Latino people of any race were 9.93% of the population.

Of the 958 households, 40.7% had children under the age of 18 living with them, 45.7% were married couples living together, 18.9% had a female householder with no husband present, and 31.5% were non-families. 25.3% of households were one person and 6.2% were one person aged 65 or older. The average household size was 2.55 and the average family size was 3.02.

The age distribution was 16.9% under the age of 18, 11.6% from 18 to 24, 46.8% from 25 to 44, 20.3% from 45 to 64, and 4.5% 65 or older. The median age was 34 years. For every 100 females, there were 263.2 males. For every 100 females age 18 and over, there were 325.0 males.

The median household income was $29,829 and the median family income  was $31,344. Males had a median income of $26,117 versus $22,031 for females. The per capita income for the city was $11,069. About 14.8% of families and 22.0% of the population were below the poverty line, including 21.0% of those under age 18 and 3.0% of those age 65 or over.

Education
The majority of the city is within the Cheney School District (No. 360). The northeastern portion is in the Great Northern School District (No. 312), grades K–6.

Healthcare 
The closest hospital to the city is Deaconess Medical Center, located in Downtown Spokane. Healthcare services located in the city itself include the Airway Heights Dental Center, West Plains Chiropractor, and APEX Physical Therapy.

Transportation
Public transportation is managed by the Spokane Transit Authority. Bus route 61, which serves Airway Heights, begins at the transit authority's main hub in Downtown Spokane, and extends to Fairchild Air Force Base.

Notable local businesses

Spokane County Raceway is one of the largest racetracks in the Inland Northwest. It offers oval track racing, drag racing, and road course racing.

Controversies
In July 2015 Mayor Patrick Rushing was asked to resign by the city council because he called President Barack Obama a "monkey man" and First Lady Michelle Obama a "gorilla" on his Facebook page. Rushing initially refused, stating he was not a racist. This follows an earlier incident in 2015 in which Rushing resigned his position as a school bus driver after he was charged with a misdemeanor for leaving the scene of an accident.

In August 2015 Rushing submitted his resignation. He stated, "I find it difficult to continue due to my declining health issues." He was succeeded by then-Deputy Mayor Kevin Richey.

References

External links
 Official site

Cities in Washington (state)
Cities in Spokane County, Washington